Robbins Field  is a public use airport located five nautical miles (9 km) northeast of the central business district of Oneonta, a city in Blount County, Alabama, United States. It is owned by the City of Oneonta and Blount County. According to the FAA's National Plan of Integrated Airport Systems for 2009–2013, it is categorized as a general aviation facility.

Facilities and aircraft 
It has one runway designated 5/23 with an asphalt surface measuring 4,210 by 80 feet (1,283 x 24 m).

For the 12-month period ending March 23, 2010, the airport had 2,776 aircraft operations, an average of 231 per month, all general aviation. At that time, there were 17 aircraft based at this airport: 88% single-engine and 12% multi-engine.

References

External links 
 Aerial image as of 24 February 1998 from USGS The National Map
 Airfield photos for 20A from Civil Air Patrol

Airports in Alabama
Transportation buildings and structures in Blount County, Alabama